The 2002 Porsche Tennis Grand Prix was a women's tennis tournament played on indoor hard courts at the Filderstadt Tennis Club in Filderstadt, Germany that was part of Tier II of the 2002 WTA Tour. It was the 25th edition of the tournament and was held from 7 October until 13 October 2002. Sixth-seeded Kim Clijsters won the singles title and earned $97,000 first-prize money.

Finals

Singles

 Kim Clijsters defeated  Daniela Hantuchová 4–6, 6–3, 6–4
 It was Clijsters' 2nd singles title of the year and the 8th of her career.

Doubles

 Lindsay Davenport /  Lisa Raymond defeated  Meghann Shaughnessy /  Paola Suárez 6–2, 6–4

Prize money

References

External links
 ITF tournament edition details
 Tournament draws

Porsche Tennis Grand Prix
Porsche Tennis Grand Prix
2002 in German tennis
2000s in Baden-Württemberg
Porsch